Hollywood, also known as The Burrus House, is an antebellum plantation house near Benoit, Mississippi that was started in 1858 and completed in 1861.  It is in Greek Revival style.  It was listed on the National Register of Historic Places in 1975.

The Burrus House is the only surviving structure in Bolivar County, Mississippi associated with the once prominent Burrus family.  It was built by John C. Burrus (1818-1879).

The movie Baby Doll was filmed here in 1956.

References

External links
 

Houses on the National Register of Historic Places in Mississippi
Houses completed in 1861
Houses in Bolivar County, Mississippi
Greek Revival houses in Mississippi
1861 establishments in Mississippi
National Register of Historic Places in Bolivar County, Mississippi